The Metal Opera Pt. II is the second full-length album by Tobias Sammet's German supergroup project, Avantasia. It is a concept album and a rock opera. The songs carry on the story begun in The Metal Opera, with the same characters. Both albums were written over the course of a year, starting in the last quarter of 1998, and both were produced from October 1999 to June 2000, with the works being interrupted for some weeks so Sammet could produce The Savage Poetry with his other band Edguy.

Track listing

Credits 
 Tobias Sammet (Edguy) - Keyboards, Bass guitar (on track 10), Vocals (see "Singers")
 Henjo Richter (Gamma Ray) - Guitars
 Markus Grosskopf (Helloween) - Bass guitar
 Alex Holzwarth (Rhapsody of Fire) - Drums

Guests

Musicians 
 Guitar
 Jens Ludwig (Edguy) (lead on tracks 5 and 9)
 Norman Meiritz (rhythm on track 10)
 Timo Tolkki (Symfonia, ex-Revolution Renaissance, ex-Stratovarius) (lead on tracks 1 and 10)
 Drums
 Eric Singer (Kiss, Black Sabbath, Alice Cooper) (on track 10)
 Keyboard
 Frank Tischer (Piano on tracks 1, 4 and 7)

Singers 
 Gabriel Laymann - Tobias Sammet (Edguy) - tracks 1-10
 Lugaid Vandroiy - Michael Kiske (Helloween, Place Vendome, Unisonic) - tracks 1 and 2
 Brother Jakob - David DeFeis (Virgin Steele) - tracks 1 and 5
 Bailiff Falk von Kronberg - Ralf Zdiarstek - track 9
 Anna Held - Sharon den Adel (Within Temptation) - track 10
 Bishop Johann von Bicken - Rob Rock (ex-Axel Rudi Pell, Driver, Impellitteri) - tracks 1 and 6
 Pope Clement VIII - Oliver Hartmann (ex-At Vance) - track 1
 Elderane the Elf - Andre Matos (ex-Symfonia, ex-Shaaman, ex-Angra, ex-Viper) - tracks 1, 2 and 8
 Regrin the Dwarf - Kai Hansen (ex-Helloween, Gamma Ray, Unisonic) - tracks 1 and 8
 Mysterious Voice of the Tower - Timo Tolkki (ex-Symfonia, ex-Revolution Renaissance, ex-Stratovarius) - track 1
 Tree of Knowledge - Bob Catley (Magnum) - tracks 3 and 4

Charts

References 

Avantasia albums
2002 albums
Rock operas
Concept albums
AFM Records albums
Albums with cover art by Jean-Pascal Fournier